Dick Wilson (1916–2007) was a British-born Canadian character actor.

Dick Wilson may also refer to:
Dick Wilson (golf course architect) (1904–1965), American golf course architect
Dick Wilson (musician) (1911–1941), American saxophonist
Dick Wilson (tribal chairman) (1934–1990), president of the Oglala Sioux Tribe of the Pine Ridge Reservation, 1972–1976
Dick Wilson (writer) (1928–2011), English journalist and writer
Dick Wilson (wrestler) (1933-2008), American Olympic wrestler
Dick Wilson (rugby league), Australian rugby league player
Robert Dick Wilson (1856–1930), American linguist

See also
Richard Wilson (disambiguation)